The women's lightweight competition in powerlifting at the 2001 World Games took place on 20 August 2001 at the Akita City Culture Hall in Akita, Japan.

Competition format
A total of 12 athletes entered the competition. Each athlete had 3 attempts in each of 3 events: squat, bench press and deadlift. The athlete with the biggest score in Wilks points is the winner.

Results

References

External links
 Results on IWGA website

Powerlifting at the 2001 World Games